is a Japanese football player currently playing for SC Sagamihara.

National team career
In August 2007, Otsuka was elected Japan U-17 national team for 2007 U-17 World Cup. He played all 3 matches.

On 23 September 2010, Otsuka was selected for the Japan Under-21 squad for the 2010 Asian Games held in Guangzhou, China PR.

Club statistics
Updated to 23 February 2018.

Appearances in major competitions

Awards and honours

Japan
AFC U-17 Championship (1) : 2006
Asian Games (1) : 2010

References

External links

Profile at Kawasaki Frontale

1990 births
Living people
Association football people from Osaka Prefecture
Sportspeople from Osaka
Japanese footballers
Japan youth international footballers
J1 League players
J2 League players
J3 League players
Gamba Osaka players
JEF United Chiba players
Giravanz Kitakyushu players
Kawasaki Frontale players
SC Sagamihara players
Asian Games medalists in football
Footballers at the 2010 Asian Games
Asian Games gold medalists for Japan
Association football forwards
Medalists at the 2010 Asian Games